(born May 9, 1971) is a Japanese cultural critic, novelist, and philosopher. He is the co-founder and former director of Genron, an independent institute in Tokyo, Japan.

Biography
Azuma was born in Mitaka, Tokyo. Azuma received his PhD in Culture and Representation from the University of Tokyo in 1999 and became a professor at the International University of Japan in 2003. He was an Executive Research Fellow and Professor at the Center for Global Communications (GLOCOM) and a Research Fellow at Stanford University's Japan Center. Since 2006, he has been working at the Center for Study of World Civilizations at the Tokyo Institute of Technology.

Azuma is married to the writer and poet Hoshio Sanae, and they have one child together. His father-in-law is the translator, novelist, and occasional critic Kotaka Nobumitsu.

Work
Hiroki Azuma is one of the most influential young literary critics in Japan, focusing on literature and on the idea of individual liberty.

He began writing inspired by the work of Kojin Karatani and Akira Asada. He is an associate of Takashi Murakami and the Superflat movement. His publishing debut was "Solzhenitsyn Essay" in 1993. Azuma handed the work directly to Karatani during his lecture series at Hosei University which Azuma was auditing.

Azuma launched his career as a literary critic in 1993 with a postmodern style influenced by leading Japanese critics Kojin Karatani and Akira Asada. In the late 1990s, Azuma began examining various pop phenomena, especially the emerging otaku/Internet/video game culture, and became widely known as an advocate of the thoughts of a new generation of Japanese. He is interested in the transformation of the Japanese literary imagination under its current “otaku-ization.”

Azuma has published seven books, including Sonzaironteki, Yubinteki (Ontological, Postal) in 1998, which focuses on Jacques Derrida's oscillation between literature and philosophy. This work won the Suntory Literary Prize in 2000 and made Azuma the youngest writer to ever win that prize. Akira Asada stated that it is one of the best books written in the 90s; however, Hiroo Yamagata pointed out that the book is based on the misunderstanding of Gödel's incompleteness theorem. He also wrote Dobutsuka-suru Postmodern (Animalizing Postmodernity) (translated as Otaku: Japan's Database Animals in 2001), which analyzes Japanese pop culture through a postmodern lens. He has also set up a non-profit organization to encourage cutting-edge critics who might be shut out of the existing publishing world.

Works
 Hiroki Azuma. 存在論的、郵便的－ジャック・デリダについて
 Hiroki Azuma. 郵便的不安達
 Hiroki Azuma. 不過視なものの世界
 Hiroki Azuma. 動物化するポストモダン―オタクから見た日本社会
 Hiroki Azuma. ゲーム的リアリズムの誕生―動物化するポストモダン2
 Hiroki Azuma. 文学環境論集―東浩紀コレクションL
 Hiroki Azuma. 情報環境論集―東浩紀コレクションS
 Hiroki Azuma. 批評の精神分析―東浩紀コレクションD
 Hiroki Azuma. 郵便的不安たちβ
 Hiroki Azuma. サイバースペースはなぜそう呼ばれるか
 Hiroki Azuma. 一般意志2.0―ルソー、フロイト、グーグル
 Hiroki Azuma. セカイからもっと近くに―現実から切り離された文学の諸問題
 Hiroki Azuma. 弱いつながり―検索ワードを探す旅
 Hiroki Azuma. ゲンロン0―観光客の哲学
 Hiroki Azuma. ゆるく考える
 Hiroki Azuma. テーマパーク化する地球
 Hiroki Azuma. 哲学の誤配
 Hiroki Azuma. 新対話篇
 Hiroki Azuma. ゲンロン戦記――「知の観客」をつくる
 Hiroki Azuma. 忘却にあらがう 平成から令和へ
 Hiroki Azuma. (2007) "The Animalization of Otaku Culture" Mechademia 2 175–188.
 Hiroki Azuma. Otaku: Japan's Database Animals. Minneapolis: University of Minnesota Press, 2009.
 Hiroki Azuma. General Will 2.0: Rousseau, Freud, Google, 2014.
 Hiroki Azuma. Philosophy of the Tourist, 2023.

Joint Works
 Kiyoshi Kasai ＆ Hiroki Azuma. 動物化する世界の中で
 Masachi Osawa ＆ Hiroki Azuma. 自由を考える――9・11以降の現代思想
 Akihiro Kitada ＆ Hiroki Azuma. 東京から考える――格差・郊外・ナショナリズム
 Eiji Otsuka ＆ Hiroki Azuma. リアルのゆくえ――おたく/オタクはどう生きるか
 Shinji Miyadai ＆ Hiroki Azuma. 父として考える
 Naoki Inose ＆ Hiroki Azuma. 正義について考えよう
 Ken Oyama ＆ Hiroki Azuma. ショッピングモールから考える――ユートピア・バックヤード・未来都市
 Yoshinori Kobayashi ＆ Shinji, Miyadai ＆ Hiroki Azuma. 戦争する国の道徳――安保・沖縄・福島
 Ken Oyama ＆ Hiroki Azuma. ショッピングモールから考える付章――庭・オアシス・ユートピア
 Daisuke Tsuda ＆ Junichiro Nakagawa ＆ Takeshi Natsuno ＆ Hiroyuki Nishimura ＆ Hiroki Azuma. ニコニコ超トークステージ――ネット言論はどこへいったのか？
 Atsushi Sasaki ＆ Hiroki Azuma. 再起動する批評――ゲンロン批評再生塾第一期全記録
 Nozomi Omori ＆ Hiroki Azuma. SFの書き方――「ゲンロン 大森望 SF創作講座」全記録
 Makoto Ichikawa ＆ Satoshi Osawa ＆ Ryota Fukushima ＆ Hiroki Azuma. 現代日本の批評1975-2001
 Makoto Ichikawa ＆ Satoshi Osawa ＆ Atsushi Sasaki ＆ Sayawaka ＆ Hiroki Azuma. 現代日本の批評1975-2001
 Hidetaka Ishida ＆ Hiroki Azuma. 新記号論――脳とメディアが出会うとき

Novels
 Hiroki Azuma. クォンタム・ファミリーズ
 Hiroki Azuma. クリュセの魚

See also
 Moe
 Kojin Karatani
 Akira Asada
Eiji Ōtsuka

References

 J'Lit | Authors : Hiroki Azuma | Books from Japan

External links
 Hiroki Azuma's homepage and blog 
 "Two Deconstructions: toward the theoretical understanding of Derrida's postal metaphors"
 "Superflat Japanese Postmodernity"
 "Anime, or something like it: Neon Genesis Evangelion"
 "Towards a cartography of Japanese anime: Anno Hideaki's >>Evangelion<<. Interview  with Azuma Hiroki"

1971 births
Anime and manga critics
Living people
Japanese philosophers
Japanese novelists
People from Mitaka, Tokyo
Academic staff of Tokyo Institute of Technology
Academic staff of Waseda University
Academic staff of the University of Tokyo
University of Tokyo alumni
Yukio Mishima Prize winners
21st-century philosophers
Japanese magazine editors